The House of Steenweeghs or Steenweeghs Lineage (French: Lignage Steenweeghs) is one of the Seven Noble Houses of Brussels, along with Roodenbeke, Sleeus, Serhuyghs, Sweerts, Serroelofs and Coudenberg.

The House of Steenweeghs was charged in 1383 with the defence of the Louvain gate, and was assisted as of 1422 by the nation of Saint-Jean.

Escutcheon 
Gules (Brussels), five escallops in a cross.

Noble houses  

The Seven noble houses of Brussels were the seven families of Brussels whose descendants formed the city's patrician class, to whom special privileges were granted until the end of the Ancien Régime.

Together with the Guilds of Brussels they formed the city's Bourgeoisie.

See also 
 Seven Noble Houses of Brussels
House of Serroelofs
House of Sweerts
House of Coudenbergh
House of Sleeus
House of Serhuyghs
House of Roodenbeke
 Bourgeois of Brussels
 Guilds of Brussels

References 

 
Seven Noble Houses of Brussels
Belgian families
People from Brussels-Capital Region